Casper Carning (born March 7, 1991) is a Swedish professional ice hockey forward, currently playing for Kungälvs IK in Division 1.

Playing career
Carning won the TV-pucken tournament with Göteborg (Gothenburg) in 2006, the following year Carning became the tournament leading point and goal scorer but his team was eliminated in the quarterfinals. Playing for Frölunda HC in the J20 SuperElit he help the team winning the Swedish Championship's Anton Cup during the 2007–08 season. Carning was loaned from Frölunda to their HockeyAllsvenskan affiliate Borås HC for the 2009–10 season. On October 16, 2009, Carning was involved in an incident in a game against Mora IK, where he body checked Mora's Mikael Owilli who suffered a broken femur from the collision—Carning received a minor penalty for boarding.

Career statistics

Regular season and playoffs

References

External links

1991 births
Living people
Borås HC players
Frölunda HC players
Swedish ice hockey right wingers
Vancouver Giants players
Ice hockey people from Gothenburg